William Anderson Alexander (June 6, 1889 – April 23, 1950) was an American football player and coach. He served as the head football coach at the Georgia Institute of Technology from 1920 to 1944, compiling a record of 134–95–15. Alexander has the second most victories of any Tech football coach. Alexander's 1928 Georgia Tech Yellow Jackets have been recognized as national champions by a number of selectors. Alexander was the first college football coach to place his teams in the four major post-season bowl games of the time: Sugar, Cotton, Orange and Rose. His teams won three of the four bowls. The 1929 Rose Bowl win, which earned his team the national championship, is the most celebrated because of the wrong-way run by California's Roy Riegels. Alexander was also the head basketball coach at Georgia Tech for four seasons from 1919 to 1924. He was inducted into the College Football Hall of Fame as a coach in 1951.

Player
Alexander played football under John Heisman and was appointed captain of the "scrubs." In his senior year he played in the Georgia and Clemson games long enough to win a letter. Alexander graduated from Georgia Tech in 1912 with a degree in civil engineering. Valedictorian of his class, he was also a brother of the Kappa Sigma fraternity.

Coach

Taking over for Heisman
"Old Aleck," as Alexander was called, succeeded John Heisman as the head coach at Georgia Tech in April 1920. Alexander had been an assistant coach for Heisman and a math teacher in the classroom at Georgia Tech. The Technique said of him:

Alexander also had a sense of humor. Whenever he diagrammed a football play, he always drew very small "x's" to represent Georgia Tech players and very large circles to represent the opposing players. As a new coach, he led Georgia Tech to three Southern Intercollegiate Athletic Association titles (1920, 1921, 1922) and its second national championship in 1928. Buck Flowers and Red Barron starred on his first teams. Alexander was the first college football coach to place his teams in the four major post-season bowl games of the time: Sugar, Cotton, Orange, and Rose. His teams won three of the four bowls.

Doug Wycoff

Describing the most spectacular play he ever saw, he cites one from the 1925 game against Vanderbilt. Star back Doug Wycoff was hurt, such that he had to use his substitute Dick Wright. On a muddy field, Wright ran off tackle and dodged Vanderbilt's safety Gil Reese, "usually a sure tackler," to get the touchdown to give Tech a 7 to 0 victory. Coach Alexander further recalled "The work of Douglas Wycoff against Notre Dame two years in succession was brilliant in the extreme, as was his plunging against Penn. State when we defeated them twice."

The Plan

During the 1927 season, Alexander instituted "the Plan." Tech and UGA had just renewed their annual rivalry game in 1925 after an eight-year hiatus. Georgia was highly rated to start the season and justified their rating throughout the season going 9–0 in their first 9 games. Alexander's plan was to minimize injuries by benching his starters early no matter the score of every game before the UGA finale. On December 3, 1927, UGA rolled into Atlanta on the cusp of a National Title. Tech's well rested starters shut out the Bulldogs 12–0 and ended any chance of UGA's first National Title.

1928
Alexander's 1928 team would be the very first Tech team to attend a bowl game. The team had amassed a perfect 9–0 record and was invited to the 1929 Rose Bowl to play California. Tech traveled by train to meet the awaiting Golden Bears. The game was a defensive struggle with the first points being scored after a Georgia Tech fumble. The loose ball was scooped up by California Center Roy Riegels and then accidentally returned in the wrong direction. Riegels returned the ball all the way to Georgia Tech's 3 yard line. After Riegels was finally stopped by his own team, the Bears opted to punt from the end zone. The punt was blocked and converted by Tech into a safety giving Tech a 2–0 lead. Cal would score a touchdown and point after but Tech would score another touchdown to finally win the game 8–7. This victory made Tech the 10–0 undefeated national champions of the 1928 college football season. It was Tech's second national title in 11 years.

Depression
Coach Alexander found campus spirit to be particularly low during the Great Depression. His football program and the other athletic teams had very few student fans attending the games. His football team faded in success after 1928, not posting another winning record until 1937. He helped to establish a spirit organization known as the Yellow Jacket Club in 1930 to bolster student spirit. The group would later become the Ramblin' Reck Club.

All-Alexander Era team
QB Buck Flowers
HB Stumpy Thomason
HB Red Barron
FB Doug Wycoff
E Bill Jordan
T Frank Speer
G Oscar Davis
C Peter Pund
G Harvey Hardy
T Vance Maree
E Bob Ison

AD
On January 30, 1945, Coach Alexander retired as head football coach but remained Georgia Tech's athletic director until his death in 1950. Alexander has the second most victories of any Tech football coach.

Legacy
Alexander was succeeded as head coach by one of his assistants, Bobby Dodd, who became the most successful head football coach in Georgia Tech history. Dodd lionized Coach Alexander, which was later reflected in his coaching style. "He taught me to treat athletes as men, not boys - to never use their failings as an alibi for a loss," Dodd said.

The Alexander Memorial Coliseum (recently renamed Hank McCamish Pavilion), the home arena of Georgia Tech's basketball teams, was named after him.

Coaching tree
Dad Amis: played for Georgia Tech (1920–1923), head coach for Furman (1928–1931).
Bobby Dodd: assistant for Georgia Tech (1931–1944), head coach for Georgia Tech (1945–1966)
Bill Fincher: played for Georgia Tech (1916–1920), head coach for William & Mary (1921), assistant for Georgia Tech (1927–1928).
Don Miller: assistant for Georgia Tech (1925–1928).
Mack Tharpe: played for Georgia Tech (1926), assistant for Georgia Tech (1928–1941).

Head coaching record

Football

References

External links

 
 

1889 births
1950 deaths
American football ends
American football quarterbacks
Georgia Tech Yellow Jackets athletic directors
Georgia Tech Yellow Jackets football coaches
Georgia Tech Yellow Jackets football players
Georgia Tech Yellow Jackets men's basketball coaches
College Football Hall of Fame inductees
Basketball coaches from Kentucky
Coaches of American football from Kentucky
Players of American football from Kentucky